The Dawn 150 is a  annual ARCA Menards Series race held at Mid-Ohio Sports Car Course in Lexington, Ohio.

History
ARCA first ran a race at Mid-Ohio in 1965. The , 150-lap race was run on May 18 on the original 15-turn circuit and was won by Jack Bowsher. On October 8, 2019, ARCA announced that it would return to the course for the 2020 season with a race on Friday, May 29, on the same weekend as the Xfinity Series race there, which was previously in August. However, these races would be cancelled due to the COVID-19 pandemic. They were added back on the schedule for 2021, but now on the first weekend in June due to Memorial Day (and therefore, the races at Charlotte) being late in 2021. The dishwashing soap company Dawn was announced as the title sponsor on May 14, 2021. The 2022 race was moved from June to July.

Past winners

Manufacturer wins

References

External links
 

ARCA Menards Series races
ARCA Menards Series
Annual sporting events in the United States
May sporting events
Motorsport in Ohio
NASCAR races at Mid-Ohio Sports Car Course